Hadawatha Mal Yayai is a 2010 Sri Lankan Sinhala romantic film directed by Ananda Wickramasinghe and produced by Thilak Kodikara for Nuwandara Films. It stars Channa Perera and Chathurika Peiris in lead roles along with Tennyson Cooray and Sanath Gunathilake. It is the 1135th Sri Lankan film in the Sinhala cinema.

Plot

Cast
 Channa Perera as Himal
 Chathurika Peiris as Lihini
 Tennyson Cooray
 Rajiv Nanayakkara
 Rathna Sumanapala
 Sanath Gunathilake
 Mahinda Pathirage
 Anushi Warnasuriya
 Srimath Indrajith Liyanage

Soundtrack

References

2010 films
2010s Sinhala-language films